The Russell M. Dicey House is a historic house at 56 Pope Street in Quincy, Massachusetts.  The -story wood-frame house was built in 1918, and is a well-preserved example of a modest Craftsman bungalow.  It has the extended eaves with brackets typical of the style, as well as a fieldstone porch with tapered square posts. Russell Dicey was a local contractor who lived here for several years, selling the house in 1927.

The house was listed on the National Register of Historic Places in 1989.

See also
National Register of Historic Places listings in Quincy, Massachusetts

References

Houses completed in 1918
Houses in Quincy, Massachusetts
National Register of Historic Places in Quincy, Massachusetts
Houses on the National Register of Historic Places in Norfolk County, Massachusetts